See You Tomorrow (Chinese: 明天也想见到你), is a 2022 Chinese romance series, starring Bunny Zhang, Zhang Kang Le, Roy Xie and Lu Yu Xiao. The series was released on 14 April 2022 on IQIYI and is also available on iQiyi app and iQ.com.

Cast 

 Bunny Zhang as Ding Liaoliao
 Zhang Kang Le as Jiang Kan
 Roy Xie as Ding Man
 Lu Yu Xiao as Lian Geyao

External links 

 https://m.douban.com/movie/subject/35248672/
 https://weibo.com/u/7490142769?refer_flag=1001030103_

References 

IQIYI original programming
2022 Chinese television series debuts
Mandarin-language television shows